Metopolophium is a genus of true bugs belonging to the family Aphididae.

The species of this genus are found in Eurasia, Australia and Northern America.

Species:
 Metopolophium albidum Hille Ris Lambers, 1947 
 Metopolophium arctogenicolens Richards, 1964

References

Aphididae